The Diplomats is a lost 1929 talking film produced and distributed by Fox Film Corporation. It was directed by Norman Taurog and starred the comedy team of Bobby Clark and Paul McCullough.

Cast
 Bobby Clark as Bobby
 Paul McCullough as Paul 
 Marguerite Churchill as The Princess
 Cissy Fitzgerald The Countess 
 John St. Polis The King of Belgravia
 Andrés de Segurola

See also
1937 Fox vault fire

References

External links

The Diplomats; allmovie.com synopsis

1929 films
Films directed by Norman Taurog
1920s English-language films
Lost American films
1929 comedy films
American comedy films
American black-and-white films
1929 lost films
Lost comedy films
1920s American films